The YM Oceanic Culture and Art Museum or Yang Ming Oceanic Culture and Art Museum (OCAM) is a museum about oceanic culture and art in Ren'ai District, Keelung, Taiwan.

History
The museum building was originally constructed in 1915 during the Japanese rule of Taiwan as the property of Nippon Yusen. After the handover of Taiwan to China in 1945, the building was taken over by the China Merchants Bureau. The building was renovated in 2003 and opened as the YM Oceanic Culture and Art Museum in 2004.

Transportation
The museum is accessible from Keelung Station of the Taiwan Railways.

See also
 List of museums in Taiwan
 YM Museum of Marine Exploration Kaohsiung
 Yang Ming Marine Transport Corporation
 Maritime industries of Taiwan

References

External links

 

2004 establishments in Taiwan
Art museums and galleries in Taiwan
Art museums established in 2004
Buildings and structures completed in 1915
Maritime museums in Taiwan
Museums in Keelung
Oceanographic organizations